Louis-Charles Mahé de La Bourdonnais (1795 – December 1840) was a French chess master, possibly the strongest player in the early 19th century.

Early life 

La Bourdonnais was born on the island of Réunion in the Indian Ocean in 1795. He was the grandson of Bertrand-François Mahé de La Bourdonnais. He learned chess in 1814 and began to take the game seriously in 1818, regularly playing at the Café de la Régence. He took lessons from Jacques François Mouret, his first teacher, and within two years he became one of the best players of the Café.

Chess career
La Bourdonnais was forced to earn his living as a professional chess player after squandering his fortune on ill-advised land deals. He played in an era before a World Chess Championship was established, but was considered to be perhaps the strongest player in the world from 1821 — when he became able to beat his chess teacher Alexandre Deschapelles — until his death in 1840.  The most famous match series in that time was the series against Alexander McDonnell in 1834. These matches of 85 games were analyzed by Kasparov in his book My Great Predecessors.

Death 
He died penniless in London on December 13, 1840, having been forced to sell all his possessions, including his clothes, to satisfy his creditors. George Walker arranged his burial a stone's throw from his old rival Alexander McDonnell at London's Kensal Green Cemetery.

Notable games 

 Alexander McDonnell vs. Louis-Charles Mahé de La Bourdonnais, 16, London 1834, Sicilian Defense: Old Sicilian. Open (B32), 0–1 A game demonstrating the strength of pawns. Its end position is one of the most surprising in the history of chess.
 Louis-Charles Mahé de La Bourdonnais vs. Alexander MacDonnell, 3, London 1834, Queen's Gambit Accepted: Old Variation (D20), 1–0 La Bourdonnais punishes McDonnell's premature attack.

See also 
 List of chess games
 McDonnell versus De La Bourdonnais, Match 4 (16), London 1834

Notes

References
World chess champions by Edward G. Winter, editor. 1981

External links

 

1795 births
1840 deaths
19th-century chess players
Burials at Kensal Green Cemetery
French chess players
French expatriates in England
People of French descent from Réunion
Deaths from edema